The 2022 British Indoor Athletics Championships were the national indoor track and field competition for British athletes, held on 26 and 27 February 2022 at Arena Birmingham. The competition served as a qualification event for the 2022 World Athletics Indoor Championships, and on 1 March, 33 British competitors were announced for that championships, and this was increased to 36 a couple of days later.

Background
The 2022 British Indoor Athletics Championships were held on 26 and 27 February 2022 at Arena Birmingham. The 2020 event had been held at the Emirates Arena in Glasgow, and the 2021 championships was cancelled due to the COVID-19 pandemic. The 2022 event was used as a qualification event for the 2022 World Athletics Indoor Championships in March 2022 in Belgrade, Serbia. In addition, parasports events were held in the 60 metres. The championships were broadcast on the BBC website.

Highlights

Sophie McKinna won the shot put event with a British Indoor Athletics Championships record distance of 18.82 metres. Lorraine Ugen won the long jump event, and equalled the Championship record.

Adelle Tracey won the 1500 metres event, ahead of Erin Wallace and Holly Archer. Adam Thomas won the men's 60 metres event, and Cheyanne Evans-Gray won the women's competition. Andrew Pozzi won the men's 60 metres hurdles event; he was the current indoor world champion at the event, and qualified for the World Championship as a result. Megan Marrs won the women's 60 metres hurdles event.

Jessie Knight won the women's 400 metres event, ahead of Keely Hodgkinson and Ama Pipi, who finished second and third respectively. Hodkingson had already qualified for the 800 metres event at the 2022 World Athletics Indoor Championships, and so decided to participate in the 400 metres race instead. Alex Haydock-Wilson finished first at the men's 400 metres event, but was later disqualified. As a result, Ben Higgins was declared the event winner.

The men's Para Mixed Ambulant 60m sprints was won by Zac Shaw in a T12 record time of 6.98 seconds. Thomas Young and Emmanuel Oyinbo-Coker finished second and third respectively. The women's event was won by Sophie Hahn, ahead of Faye Olszowka and Esme O'Connell.

On the first day of the Championships, five athletes achieved qualification for the 2022 World Athletics Indoor Championships. On the second day, eight further athletes qualified for the World Championships. On 1 March, UK Athletics announced that 33 athletes would compete for Great Britain at the 2022 World Athletics Indoor Championships. On 3 March, three additional competitors were announced, bringing the total up to 36.

Results

Men

Women

References

External links
Results

British Indoor Championships
2022
Athletics Indoor
Athletics competitions in England
British Indoor Athletics Championships
Sports competitions in Birmingham, West Midlands